Turbay is a surname. Notable people with the surname include:

Claudia Turbay Quintero (born 1952), Colombian journalist and diplomat
Diana Turbay (1950–1991), Colombian journalist
Gabriel Turbay (1901–1947), Colombian diplomat and politician
Julio César Turbay Ayala (1916–2005), former president of Colombia
Julio César Turbay Quintero (born 1949), Colombian politician
Nydia Quintero Turbay (born 1932), former First Lady of Colombia
Paola Turbay (born 1970), Colombian-American actress